Metapelma is a parasitic wasp genus in the family Eupelmidae.

Species 
 Metapelma albisquamulata Enderlein, 1912
 Metapelma angustipes Ferrière, 1938
 †Metapelma archetypon Gibson, 2009
 Metapelma bachi Girault, 1922
 Metapelma beijingense Yang, 1996
 Metapelma berlandi Ferrière, 1938
 Metapelma compressipes Cameron, 1909
 Metapelma cubense Ashmead, 1900
 Metapelma elegantulum Ferrière, 1938
 Metapelma feae Masi, 1923
 Metapelma giraulti Ferrière, 1938
 Metapelma gloriosum Westwood, 1874
 Metapelma goethei Girault, 1928
 Metapelma insigne (Förster, 1860)
 Metapelma ledouxi Risbec, 1953
 Metapelma leucoptera Risbec, 1958
 Metapelma madecassa Ferrière, 1938
 Metapelma mesandamana Mani & Kaul, 1973
 Metapelma mirabile Brues, 1906
 Metapelma nobile (Förster, 1860)
 Metapelma obscuratum Westwood, 1874
 Metapelma pacificum Nikol'skaya, 1952
 Metapelma palauense Yoshimoto & Ishii, 1965
 Metapelma patrizii Masi, 1923
 Metapelma riparia Prinsloo, 1985
 Metapelma ruficauda Ferrière, 1938
 Metapelma rufimanum Westwood, 1874
 Metapelma salomonis Ferrière, 1938
 Metapelma schwarzi (Ashmead, 1890)
 Metapelma seyrigi Risbec, 1952
 Metapelma spectabile Westwood, 1835
 Metapelma strychnocola Mani & Kaul, 1973
 Metapelma sylvaticum Risbec, 1953
 Metapelma taprobanae Westwood, 1874
 Metapelma tenuicrus Gahan, 1925
 Metapelma turneri Ferrière, 1938
 Metapelma westwoodi Girault, 1915
 Metapelma zhangi Yang, 1996

References

External links 
Description: Westwood, J.O. 1835. May 26th 1835. Various hymenopterous insects, partly from the collection of the Rev. F.W. Hope. Proceedings of the Zoological Society of London III: 68-72. https://www.biodiversitylibrary.org/item/96158#page/247/mode/1up

Hymenoptera genera
Eupelmidae